Motorway 62 (A62) is a small, toll-free branch of the A6 which connects the Athens International Airport with the highway. Its length is 6 km (4 mi) and it serves as the main route to the Athens International Airport.

On 4 December 2015, the Greek government proposed to renumber the A62 as the A64: In practice, the renumbering did not take place, because road signs still show the motorway as the A62.

Exit list

References 

62
Roads in Attica
Transport in East Attica
Buildings and structures in East Attica

el:Αττική Οδός